United States gubernatorial elections were held in 1932, in 35 states, concurrent with the House, Senate elections and presidential election, on November 8, 1932 (September 12 in Maine).

Results

See also 
1932 United States elections
1932 United States presidential election
1932 United States Senate elections
1932 United States House of Representatives elections

Notes

References 

 
November 1932 events in the United States